Dandelion Wine is a 1997 Russian TV film based on the 1957 book of the same name by Ray Bradbury.

It is the last film of Innokenti Smoktunovsky, released after his death.

Cast 
 Innokenti Smoktunovsky
 Andrei Novikov
 Sergei Kuznetsov
 Vsevolod Polishchuk
 Liya Akhedzhakova
 Yevgeni Gerchakov
 Lev Perfilov
 Lidiya Dranovskaya
 Vera Vasilyeva
 Vladimir Zeldin
 Sergei Suponev

References

External links 
 

1997 films
Films based on American novels
1990s Russian-language films
Russian television films
Ukrainian adventure films
Films based on works by Ray Bradbury
1990s adventure drama films
Films based on science fiction novels
Russian adventure drama films
Ukrainian television films